Benedict has been the papal name of fifteen Roman Catholic popes.  The name is derived from the Latin benedictus, meaning "blessed".

Additionally, four antipopes have used the name Benedict:
Antipope Benedict X (1058–1059) – several cardinals alleged that his election was irregular and he was deposed.  His papacy, though later declared illegitimate, has been taken into account in the conventional numbering of subsequent Popes who took the same name.
Antipope Benedict XIII (1394–1423)
Antipope Benedict XIV (1424–1429), (1430–1437) – two individuals

See also
Benedict (disambiguation)

Benedict